The knockout stages of the 2011 Copa Santander Libertadores de América consisted of four stages:
Round of 16 (first legs: April 26–28; second legs: May 3–5)
Quarterfinals (first legs: May 11–12; second legs: May 18–19)
Semifinals (first legs: May 25–26; second legs: June 1–2)
Finals (first leg: June 15; second leg: June 22)

Format
The group winners and runners-up of the second stage qualified for the knockout stages. The sixteen teams played a single-elimination tournament. In each stage, teams played in two-legged ties on a home-away basis, with the higher-seeded team playing the second leg at home. Each team earned 3 points for a win, 1 point for a draw, and 0 points for a loss. The following criteria were used for breaking ties on points, except for the final:
Goal difference
Away goals
Penalty shootout (no extra time is played)
For the final, the first tiebreaker was goal difference. If tied on goal difference, the away goals rule would not be applied, and 30 minutes of extra time would be played. If still tied after extra time, the title would be decided by penalty shootout.

If two teams from the same association reach the semifinals, they would be forced to play each other.

Qualified teams

Seeding
The 16 qualified teams were seeded in the knockout stages according to their results in the second stage, with the group winners seeded 1–8, and the group runners-up seeded 9–16. The teams were ranked by: 1. Points (Pts); 2. Goal difference (GD); 3. Goals scored (GF); 4. Away goals (AG); 5. Drawing of lots.

Bracket
In each tie, the higher-seeded team played the second leg at home.

Round of 16
Team 1 played the second leg at home.

Match A

Tied on points 3–3, Once Caldas won on goal difference.

Match B

Note: The original kickoff time was 21:50, but the match was delayed due to floodlight failure.

Tied on points 3–3, Libertad won on goal difference.

Match C

Peñarol won on points 4–1.

Match D

Tied on points 2–2, Jaguares won on away goals.

Match E

Tied on points 2–2, Cerro Porteño won on penalties.

Match F

Universidad Católica won on points 6–0.

Match G

Vélez Sársfield won on points 6–0.

Match H

Santos won on points 4–1.

Quarterfinals
Team 1 played the second leg at home.

Match S1

Santos won on points 4–1.

Match S2

Note: The match was moved from Estadio José Amalfitani as the home stadium of Vélez Sársfield was closed after fans fired volleys of flares during their Clausura match against Banfield.

Vélez Sársfield won on points 6–0.

Match S3

Tied on points 3–3, Peñarol won on goal difference.

Match S4

Cerro Porteño won on points 4–1.

Semifinals
Team 1 played the second leg at home.

Match F1

Santos won on points 4–1.

Match F2

Tied on points 3–3, Peñarol won on away goals.

Finals

The Finals were played over two legs, with the higher-seeded team playing the second leg at home. If the teams were tied on points and goal difference at the end of regulation in the second leg, the away goals rule would not be applied and 30 minutes of extra time would be played. If still tied after extra time, the title would be decided by penalty shootout.

Santos won on points 4–1.

References

External links
Official webpage  

Knockout stages